Utah State Route 58 may refer to:
 Interstate 80 Business (West Wendover, Nevada–Wendover, Utah), designated as SR-58 in Utah since 1969
 Utah State Route 58 (1965–1969), a former state route that ran along the alignment of US-91 through Kanarraville from 1965 to 1969
 Utah State Route 58 (1953), a former state route connecting SR-36 to Clover in Tooele County until 1953